Dhemaji College is located in Dhemaji, Assam, India. It was founded on 1 August 1965.

Dhemaji College is the oldest institution of higher learning in the district of Dhemaji. At present it imparts education from Higher-secondary to Bachelor Degree level in Arts and Science streams along with different parallel oriented courses with an experienced and efficient teaching staff.

Dhemaji College has been Conferred as College of  Centre with Potential Excellence (CPE)  status by UGC in 2010.

Academics 

The college offers major (honours) courses almost in all customary subjects in the Arts and Science stream.

Courses
Presently the college offers following courses. 
 Higher Secondary (Arts and Science)
 Bachelor degree (Arts and Science)
 Computer Science Degree (BCA) (upcoming) 
 PG Diploma Courses
Plant tissue-culture postgraduate diploma
Disaster Management postgraduate diploma
 UG Diploma
 Certificate 
 Computer Application.
 Human Rights,
 Travel and Tourism management,
PG Diploma Course on Forestry and Wild Life Management etc..

The college also offers the different courses of Krishna Kanta Handique State Open University in the respective study center of the open University in the college.

Educational departments

Arts:
 English Department
 Assamese Department
 Education Department
 Economics Department
 History Department
 Political Science Department
 Philosophy Department
 Mathematics Department
 Sociology Department

Science:
 Botany Department
 Zoology Department
 Chemistry Department
 Physics Department
 Electronics Department
 Computer Science Department
 Economics Department
 Mathematics Department

Weather Information centre 

The college has an Automatic Weather Information Centre under the sponsorship of Indian Space Research Organisation (ISRO), Bangalore and Assam Science, Technology and Environment Council (ASTEC), Guwahati. Moreover, another Automatic Weather Information Centre is installed in the college sponsored by ASTEC and Department of Science and Technology, Government of Assam.

See also 

 List of accredited colleges in Assam
 2004 Dhemaji school bombing

References

Dhemaji
Universities and colleges in Assam
Colleges affiliated to Dibrugarh University
Educational institutions established in 1965
1965 establishments in Assam